The Rio Negro tuco-tuco (Ctenomys rionegrensis) is a species of rodent in the family Ctenomyidae. It is found in a small fragmented range in Entre Ríos Province in northeastern Argentina and in the Río Negro Department of western Uruguay. It is restricted to sand dunes, and is threatened by the conversion of this habitat to forestry plantations.

References

Mammals of Argentina
Mammals of Uruguay
Mammals described in 1970
Tuco-tucos